Singles (also written s1NgLEs) it is the title of a Greek youth comedy television series aired by Mega Channel in the 2004-2008 seasons. It was created by Giorgos Fidas and directed by Panagiotis Kravvas in the first season and Stefanos Blatsos afterwards. The series presents the lives of a group of young people, their work and relationships, love and social. In each episode are described by the heroes (mainly Rania), theories of life and we see how it is applied to the life of each character and his social environment, while through the series various social issues are touched upon such as friendship, sexuality, family and mainly the relationships of people nowadays. The main characters of the series are Rania (Maria Solomou) and Lila (Sunny Chatziargiri). In each cycle of the series the lead cast receives changes with Addition and subtraction of characters, with the above two roles remaining in the series from beginning to end.

Series overview

Development 
While the first season of the series was scheduled to premiere in the fall of 2004 along with the rest of the station's series, filming significantly delayed the delivery of the episodes due to the theatrical obligations of the protagonists. Thus, it was moved to the second half of the 2004-05 season and premiered in January 2005 and concluded in 21 episodes in June 2005. Its good performance in weekly televarometers and its increase in popularity (even through the online website created by the contributors - pioneer for the time) convinced the station to renew it for a second season, which, however, did not air the following season due to the pregnancy of Maria Solomou at the end of the first season. This resulted in the series being completed differently and Rania's role as a pregnant woman being reconstructed.

Finally, the second season titled Singles 2 started in October 2006 with the lead cast having undergone changes and the series presenting the lives of the heroes five years after the end of the first season, with Stefanos Blatsos as director. It ended in 28 episodes in June 2007.

The third season, titled Singles 2½, began in October 2007 and was the continuation of the story of Singles 2, and concluded in 11 episodes in January 2008. The fourth and final season of the series began in February 2008, titled Singles 3, and ended with 15 episodes in June 2008 after a total of 75 episodes.

Cast

Main 
 Maria Solomou as Rania Konstantakatou
 Sunny Chatziargiri as Lila Steni
 Panagiota Vlanti as Maro Petropoulou
 Aris Servetalis as Fotis Lagoudakis
 Maximos Moumouris as Orestis Stergiou
 Sokratis Patsikas as Billy (Vasilis) Chatziantoniou
 Odisseas Papaspiliopoulos as Arthuros Papaikonomou
 Antonis Fragkakis as Lucas Seretis
 Stefi Poulopoulou as Katerina Koukoutsaki
 Giorgos Seitaridis as Nontas Peristeropoulos
 Stamatis Zakolikos as Spiros

Recurring 

 Ersi Malikenzou as Nelli Petropoulou
 Giorgos Konstantis as Arthuros's father
 Eleni Kallia as Aggeliki Sereti
 Panagiotis Bougiouris as Giannis Seretis
 Christina Panagiotidou as Gogo
 Marinos Desillas as Miltos Samaras
 Fani Spiridaki as Luisa
 Nikos Katrakis as Antonis Mavros
 Giorgos Chrisostomou as Makis Chatzoglou
 Panos Mouzourakis as Tzaba (Varitimos)
 Vlasis Fidas as Aggelos Seretis
 Filippos Gkotsopoulos as Lucas Seretis jr.

Guest star 
 Mirto Alikaki as Sophia
 Leonardo Sfontouris as Petros
 Reggina Pantelidi as Nantia
 Eri Bakali as Eri Magana
 Dimitris Vogiatzis as Fontas Stergiou
 Vana Rabota as Irini
 Tasos Pirgieris as Elias
 Maria Korinthiou as Maria
 Giorgos Manikas as Vasilis
 Dimitris Plionis as Dimitris
 Aggeliki Dimitrakopoulou as Thalia
 Vaggelis Takos as Pavlos Markidis
 Orfeas Papadopoulos as Jenius Stenis
 Evaggelia Stamatelou as Reggina
 Antonis Karistinos as James White
 Iro Mane as Chrisoula Koukoutsaki
 Anna Andrianou as Antigoni Mayhem
 Panagiotis Dedevesis as Nikos
 Nontas Katsifis as Minos
 Evgenia Dimitropoulou as Agapi
 Kostas Grekas as Michalis
 Giorgos Bavelis as Konstantinos
 and Akis Sakellariou as company General Manager

Episodes

Season 1 (2004-05) 

 Air date: Tuesday at 10:40pm

Season 2 (2006-07) 

 Air date: Wednesday at 10:00pm (episodes 22-32), Wednesday at 10:50pm (episodes 33-49)

Season 3 (2007-08) 

 Air date: Wednesday at 11:00pm (episodes 50-58), Wednesday at 10:30pm (episodes 59-60)

 The episodes are divided into two parts and have a title for each part.

Season 4 (2007-08) 

 Air date: Wednesday at 10:30pm

References

External links 
 

Mega Channel original programming
2000s Greek television series
2004 Greek television series debuts
2008 Greek television series endings